Robert Gilbert may refer to:

Robert Gilbert (chemist) (born 1946), Australian chemist
Robert Gilbert (musician) (1899–1978), German musician
Robert Gilbert (bishop) (died 1448), Dean of York, Bishop of London 1436–1448
Bobby Gilbert, Irish footballer
Robert Gilbert (MP for Weymouth), member of parliament for Weymouth, 1390
Robert Gilbert (MP for Gloucester) (fl. 1415–1432), MP for Gloucester
Robert A. Gilbert (1870–1942), African-American nature photographer
Robert Andrew Gilbert (b. 1942), antiquarian book dealer and authority on the history of magic and esoteric organizations